Dog City is a studio album by the American band Crack the Sky, released in 1990.

Critical reception

The Washington Post wrote: "Like Jeff Lynne, everything John Palumbo touches in the studio has a certain cleverness and sheen about it, and Dog City is about as crafty an album as you're likely to find on an independent label. Still, for all of Palumbo's production know-how,Dog City is only as good as the songs, which makes it a rather dicey bet." The Colorado Springs Gazette-Telegraph panned the forced topicality of the songs, also writing that "dim musical presentation doesn't exactly spruce up this LP's listenability, either." The Rocky Mountain News noted that "Crack the Sky is guilty of one of rock 'n' roll's deadly sins: wrapping politically charged messages in dull, plodding music."

Track listing

Personnel
Crack the Sky
John Palumbo – guitar, bass guitar, drums, vocals
Rick Witkowski – lead guitar, keyboards
Vince DePaul – keyboards
Carey Ziegler – bass guitar
Joe D'Amico – backing vocals

Additional Musicians
Marvin Brown, Terry Williams, Mark Easley, Krista, The Harrison Hill Gospel Group, The Roz Diamond Children's Choir – background vocalists
Leo McLaughlin – blues harp

Production
Steve Palmieri – engineer

References

Crack the Sky albums
1990 albums